Bruce Kasman is the managing director and Head of Economic Research at the United States financial services firm JPMorgan Chase and as of  June 2009, head of the American Bankers Association's Economic Advisory Committee.

Biography
Before joining JPMorgan in 1994, Kasman was a senior international economist at Morgan Stanley.  He started his career at the New York Federal Reserve.

Kasman holds a 1985 PhD from Columbia University.

References

American Bankers Association
American economists
Columbia University alumni
Living people
Year of birth missing (living people)